Gossamer Folds is a 2020 American drama film directed by Lisa Donato and starring Alexandra Grey and Jackson Robert Scott.  Yeardley Smith serves as one of the producers of the film.  It is Donato's directorial feature debut.

Cast
Jackson Robert Scott as Tate
Alexandra Grey as Gossamer
Sprague Grayden as Frannie
Shane West as Billy
Ethan Suplee as Jimbo
Franklin Ojeda Smith as Edward
Yeardley Smith as Phyllis
Jen Richards as Diana
Brenda Currin as Maybelle
Laurie Foxx as Karen - Mother of the Bride
Camilla Marchena as Carmen

Production
Principal photography began on November 15, 2018.  In January 2019, it was announced that Shane West completed his scenes in the film.  Yeardley Smith confirmed in a March 2019 interview with Forbes that the film "is currently being edited."

Release
The film made its worldwide premiere at the 2020 Bentonville Film Festival.  The film also premiered at the 2020 KASHISH Mumbai International Queer Film Festival.  It was also featured at the Outfest LA Film Festival in August 2020.

Accolades

References

External links
 
 

2020 films
2020 drama films
American drama films
Films scored by Aaron Zigman
Films about trans women
2020 LGBT-related films
2020s English-language films
2020s American films
American LGBT-related films